Kengesh is a village in the Ysyk-Ata District of Chüy Region of Kyrgyzstan. Its population was 2,927 in 2021. It was established in 1929.

References

Populated places in Chüy Region